The Diocese of Covasna and Harghita is a diocese of the Romanian Orthodox Church. Its see is the Saint Nicholas Cathedral in Miercurea Ciuc and its ecclesiastical territory covers Covasna and Harghita counties. The diocese forms part of the Metropolis of Transylvania. It has two archpriests' districts, around 110 priests in 140 churches, of which 47 are historic monuments, eight monasteries and two sketes with around 130 monks, and classes for theological education at a high school in Toplița. It was established in 1994.

Bishops
 (1994–2014)
Andrei Moldovan (2015–)

Notes

External links
Official site

Covasna
1994 establishments in Romania
Covasna
Harghita County
Covasna County